Joe Allen Evyagotailak was born 15 July 1953 in Kugluktuk, Nunavut, Canada. Evyagotailak was the Member of the Legislative Assembly (MLA) for the electoral district of Kugluktuk having won the seat in the 2004 Nunavut election.

Evyagotailak is a notable Copper Inuit. On 20 August 2008, Evyagotailak stepped down as the MLA. He stated that he wanted to run for the presidency of the Kitikmeot Inuit Association (KIA).

Prior to becoming an MLA, in the Legislative Assembly of Nunavut Evyagotailak was the mayor of Kugluktuk and worked with several local organizations, including the KIA of which he was both vice-president and president.

External links
Joe Allen Evyagotailak at the Legislative Assembly of Nunavut

References

1953 births
Living people
Inuit from the Northwest Territories
Inuit politicians
Members of the Legislative Assembly of Nunavut
21st-century Canadian politicians
Mayors of Kugluktuk
People from Kugluktuk
Inuit from Nunavut